Jerzy Pertek (1920-1989) was a Polish journalist and writer specializing in maritime topics, particularly the history of the Polish Navy in the interwar period and World War II. He authored about 60 books and close to 2000 articles.

After his death, his collection of books and other publications related to the maritime history was taken over by the Raczyński Library, and a small museum  was created in his former house.

References 

1920 births
1989 deaths
Recipients of the Medal of Merit for National Defence
Knights of the Order of Polonia Restituta
20th-century Polish historians
Polish male non-fiction writers
Polish journalists
Maritime writers